Thion may refer to:

People 

Jérôme Thion (born 1977), French rugby union player
Serge Thion (1942–2017), French sociologist and Holocaust denier
Thione Seck (born 1955), Senegalese musician

Places 
Thion, Burkina Faso, town in Burkina Faso
Thion, an island in Vanuatu